The 1997 Ms. Olympia contest was an IFBB professional bodybuilding competition was held on November 22, 1997, at the  Beacon Theatre in New York City, New York. It was the 18th Ms. Olympia competition held.

Results

Notable Events

Olympia competitor to compete by this point.

See also
 1997 Mr. Olympia

References

 1997 Ms. and Fitness Olympia
 1997 Ms. Olympia held in New York City on November 22nd
 1997 Ms Olympia Results

External links
 Competitor History of the Ms. Olympia

Ms Olympia, 1997
1997 in bodybuilding
Ms. Olympia
Ms. Olympia
History of female bodybuilding
November 1997 sports events in the United States